Matthew Crenshaw (born July 19, 1978) is an American basketball coach and former point guard who is currently the head coach of Indiana University–Purdue University Indianapolis' men's basketball team, a role he has held since 2021.

Military career 
Crenshaw enlisted in the United States Navy out of high school and spent six years in the service, assigned to posts such as the USS Kansas City, Navy Cargo Handling Port Group (NAVCHAPGRU), and in Washington, D.C.

Coaching career

IUPUI 
IUPUI hired Crenshaw as an assistant coach in 2006, and promoted him to associate head coach in 2011.

Ball State 
Crenshaw joined the coaching staff at Ball State as an assistant coach on October 19, 2018.

IUPUI (second stint) 
Crenshaw was named the head coach at IUPUI on April 13, 2021, the program's tenth in school history.

Head coaching record

References

External links 
 Matt Crenshaw on Twitter
 IUPUI Jaguars profile

1978 births
Living people
Sportspeople from Charlottesville, Virginia
Basketball players from Virginia
Basketball coaches from Virginia
Point guards
United States Navy sailors
IUPUI Jaguars men's basketball players
Czarni Słupsk players
IUPUI Jaguars men's basketball coaches
Ball State Cardinals men's basketball coaches